Al-Khameri is a sub-district located in Huth District, 'Amran Governorate, Yemen. Al-Khameri had a population of 1373 according to the 2004 census.

References 

Sub-districts in Huth District